Proto-Basque, or Pre-Basque, is the reconstructed predecessor of the Basque language before the Roman conquests in the Western Pyrenees.

Background
The first linguist who scientifically approached the question of the historical changes that Basque had undergone over the centuries was Koldo Mitxelena. His work on Proto-Basque focused mainly on between the 5th century BCE and the 1st century CE, just before and after initial contact with the Romans. The main method that he used was internal reconstruction since Basque has no known genetic relatives, preventing the use of the comparative method. By comparing variants of the same word in modern dialects and the changes that Latin loanwords had undergone, he deduced the ancestral forms and the rules for historical sound changes. His groundbreaking work, which culminated with the publication of his book Fonética histórica vasca (1961), was carried out mostly before the Aquitanian inscriptions were found, but they fully backed up Mitxelena's proposed Proto-Basque forms.

Since then, a number of other prominent linguists, such as Larry Trask, Alfonso Irigoien, Henri Gavel and most recently Joseba Lakarra, Joaquín Gorrotxategi and Ricardo Gómez, have made further contributions to the field. Some of them, such as Lakarra, have focused their attention on even older layers of the language (Pre-Proto-Basque) that preceded the Celtic invasion of Iberia.

Vocabulary
Studying the behaviour of Latin and early Romance loanwords in Basque, Koldo Mitxelena discovered that Proto-Basque *n was lost between vowels and that Proto-Basque had no *m. Both changes are relatively unusual cross-linguistically, but /n/ was also partially deleted between vowels during the history of the nearby Gascon and Galician-Portuguese.

One of the puzzles of Basque is the large number of words that begin with vowels in which the initial and second vowels are the same. Joseba Lakarra proposes that in Pre-Proto-Basque there was extensive reduplication and that later, certain initial consonants were deleted, leaving the VCV pattern of Proto-Basque:

See also
Vasconic languages
Proto-Basque Swadesh list (Wiktionary)

Notes

References

External links
 
 Joseba Lakarra (2006), "Protovasco, munda y otros: Reconstrucción interna y tipología holística diacrónica", in "Oihenart. Cuadernos de Lengua y Literatura".  
 Ricardo Gómez, "De re etymologica: vasc. -(r)antz 'hacia'", UPV/EHU / "Julio Urkixo" Euskal Filologia Mintegia  

Proto-Basque
Basque
Pre-Indo-Europeans